Bill Ritter (born February 26, 1950) is an American television news anchor and journalist. He has been with WABC-TV in New York City since 1998, initially anchoring on weekends before succeeding Bill Beutel on the 11 p.m. news in September 1999, then at 6 p.m. in February 2001. He is also a correspondent for the ABC News program 20/20.

For Eyewitness News, Ritter traveled to Israel the week before the start of the war in Iraq, to find out how Israelis and Palestinians were preparing for a possible military conflict 500 miles from their land.

Ritter has investigated drug use among some teenage Orthodox Jews in Brooklyn, and looked into problems with the dramatic increase in the number of building scaffoldings in New York. Ritter also covers fire safety and prevention for Eyewitness News, and hosts the annual "Operation 7 Save A Life" a special and campaign. Ritter has climbed the Empire State Building, tagging along with the man who repairs and replaces the broadcast antennas on top of one of New York's tallest skyscrapers. And, for the first time on live television, Ritter was tested for prostate cancer. As part of the test, Ritter also interviewed New York's most famous prostate cancer patient: former Mayor Rudy Giuliani.

Ritter used to write a daily column, Behind the News with Bill Ritter, which previewed the 11 pm edition of Eyewitness News. It was sent via e-mail, and regularly offered insights into how it gathers the news.

Career

KTTV
Previously, the Los Angeles native reported on the Rodney King trial and the subsequent Los Angeles riots for the Fox Television Network. From August 1991 through February 1992, Ritter also served as a reporter for the Fox Network's nationally syndicated show Entertainment Daily Journal (E.D.J.); and from February 1990 to August 1991 was an investigative reporter for KTTV-TV (Fox Television) in Los Angeles. He also was an anchor for the station's Gulf War coverage.

KNSD
While serving as a business, then investigative reporter for KNSD, the NBC affiliate in San Diego, from February 1987 to January 1990, Ritter, known for his white-collar crime investigations, captured four Emmy Awards. In 1989 he was honored for his investigative reporting in uncovering a local stock swindle, as well as for his "overall journalistic enterprise."

In 1987, he also won in both of these categories, this time for his reports exposing a safety scandal involving killer whales and their trainers at San Diego's Sea World of California. Ritter also was named NBC Affiliate Reporter of the Year in 1987 and 1988.

KCAL
Prior to joining ABC, Ritter was a reporter for KCAL-TV, the former Disney-owned independent station in Los Angeles, from June to December 1992, where his "Up Front" segment headlined the station's successful 9 p.m. weeknight news broadcast, showcasing his perspective of the day's top national or international story.

ABC News

Good Morning America Sunday
Before joining Eyewitness News, Ritter worked at ABC News in January 1993 as co-anchor of Good Morning America Sunday. Since then he has covered dozens of important news stories for Good Morning America, including the crash of TWA Flight 800, the death of Princess Diana, the criminal and civil trials of O. J. Simpson, the aftermath of the Oklahoma City bombing and the devastating Midwest floods of 1997.

Ritter's feature reporting for GMA includes revealing interviews with boxers Mike Tyson and Evander Holyfield, golfers Jack Nicklaus and Arnold Palmer, former evangelist Jim Bakker and Peanuts cartoonist Charles Schulz. He also contributed to GMAs series, which included in-depth looks at drugs and teenagers, the alarming increase in "budget" plastic surgeries and the emotional consequences of so-called "blended" or step families.

20/20
For 20/20, Ritter has reported stories that run the gamut from light-hearted to heart-warming to deadly serious. He investigated the claims of James Van Praagh, the supposed psychic who says he can talk to the dead; he covered the Columbine shootings; he investigated the phenomenon of patients waking up during surgery; he reported on "slip and fall" scams at casinos across the nation; he reported on a New York man who died while donating his kidney to his wife, whose family says the doctor left the O.R. before the surgery was completed; he examined the effects of parental anger on kids by having cameras in several homes for several weeks; he debunked the so-called urban legends that sprung up in the wake of September 11; and he followed a group of female Army recruits as they went through a grueling nine weeks of basic training.

On the lighter side, he has paraglided off an 11,000-foot mountain in Aspen, scaled a rock face in Jasper, Canada, "posed" as a bull-clown at a rodeo in Texas and was the first non-Barnum and Bailey employee to perform on a trapeze for that circus.

Eyewitness News
In September 1999, Ritter was officially named to co-anchor Eyewitness News 11pm broadcast with Diana Williams and seventeen months later in February 2001 was added to co-anchor the 6pm edition of the newscast as well. In 2003, upon Williams’ move to the 5pm broadcasts, Ritter was joined at 6 & 11pm by Liz Cho. In 2011, 5pm anchor Sade Baderinwa replaced Cho at 11pm alongside Ritter when Cho was asked to launch the newly created 4pm newscast alongside David Navarro in the time-slot occupied for the prior 25 years by the Oprah Winfrey Show.  On September 13, 2019 Ritter was named the new co-anchor of the 5pm edition alongside Baderinwa, replacing Diana Williams who had retired from the station after 29 years and had her last broadcast the day before.

Personal life
Ritter was born to a Jewish family. In 1972, he was expelled from San Diego State University for protesting the Vietnam War; at the time he was one semester short of graduating. At his daughter's suggestion 40 years later, he decided to complete his college education, receiving a degree from The New School on May 20, 2016.

See also
 New Yorkers in journalism

References

External links
 WABC-TV Bio: Bill Ritter
 ABC News Bio: Bill Ritter

Living people
1950 births
American television reporters and correspondents
Jewish American journalists
21st-century American Jews